Barbara Bebe Lyon (September 9, 1931 – July 10, 1995) was a singer of popular songs and actress, born in the United States but primarily active in the United Kingdom.

Life and career
She was born in Hollywood, California. Her parents, Ben Lyon and Bebe Daniels, were both Hollywood actors, beginning in silent films with careers extending into the 1930s. In the early part of World War II, Ben Lyon joined the Royal Air Force, and though the family returned later to the United States, they made Britain their adopted home. From 1950 to 1961 they had a radio programme on the BBC, Life With The Lyons. Ben, Bebe, Barbara, and Barbara's brother Richard all played themselves on this show (perhaps inspired by the success in the US of The Adventures of Ozzie and Harriet, also featuring a real-life family), bringing the family before the UK public.

In the 1950s, both Barbara and Richard began their own independent careers; Richard recorded one single, but primarily found his career to be as an actor, both in the UK and the US. With Barbara, the situation was reversed: she did some acting, but found more popularity as a singer, with two hits in the UK Singles Chart. However, after those two hits she was unable to chart, and went into acting, both in the UK and U.S.

Lyon sang in her own TV series, Dreamtime With Barbara (1956). She married Russell Turner, the show's producer, at St. James' Church in London the following year. The couple divorced, and she married accountant Colin Birkett in 1968. They had one son, and later divorced.

Death
Lyon died on July 10, 1995, of a cerebral hemorrhage at the age of 63.

Discography
"Stowaway" (1955) - Columbia - UK #12
"Letter to a Soldier" (1956) - Columbia - UK #27

References

External links

Biography/discography (only shows 45rpm singles)
Biography on IMDb
Obituary from The Independent (London)

1931 births
1995 deaths
American expatriates in the United Kingdom
American people of Scottish descent
American people of Colombian descent
American people of Jewish descent
People from Hollywood, Los Angeles
Traditional pop music singers
American television actresses
20th-century American actresses
20th-century American singers
Actresses from Los Angeles
Singers from Los Angeles
20th-century American women singers